Quşlar or Kushlar may refer to:
 Quşlar, Kurdamir, Azerbaijan
 Quşlar, Qabala, Azerbaijan